WTSL (1400 AM) is a commercial radio station licensed to Hanover, New Hampshire, United States.  It airs an adult hits radio format and serves the Lebanon-Hanover-White River Junction area.  The station is currently owned by Great Eastern Radio, LLC.  WTSL also broadcasts Dartmouth College Big Green football and hockey games.

Listeners can also hear WTSL programming on FM translator stations W248DA at 97.5 MHz in Hanover and W269DI at 101.7 in Claremont as well as on HD subchannel WHDQ-HD2 in Claremont.  The stations call themselves "97.5 & 101.7 The Penguin."

History
In October 1950, WTSL first signed on.  It was owned by Granite State Broadcasters and was powered at only 250 watts, a network affiliate of the Mutual Broadcasting System.  In 1961, the daytime power was increased to 1,000 watts.  In the 1980s, the nighttime power was also boosted to 1,000 watts.

In the June 1970, the station was acquired by Tri City Broadcasting. from Knight Quality Stations. Sound Citizens Communications bought the station in 1974. Up to this time, WTSL carried the NBC Radio Network news and music show Monitor, along with Boston Red Sox baseball, via an over-the-air feed from WGIR-FM in Manchester (as well nearby WTSV-FM (106.1) in Claremont, NH.. It aired a middle of the road music format.  In the 1970s, WTSL dropped NBC, adding the CBS Radio Network and later, returning to the Mutual Broadcasting System as a secondary affiliation.  This change would allow WTSL to switch from overnight music to talk with Larry King.  After a period with Mutual, WTSL was asked to become the Primary affiliate in the Lebanon/ Hanover market, but turned was it down.  Mutual then moved to nearby WNHV AM/FM and WTSL joined ABC in order to carry Paul Harvey, which had been on WNHV.  During this period of time, the studios were co-located at its Oak Ridge Road West Lebanon, NH transmitter site.  Studio were moved to the downtown Lebanon mall along with then sister station WTSL-FM (now  WGXL- FM).  Several owners later, the station was purchased by Robert Frisch, moving his WXXK (originally on 101.7 FM however moving to 100.5 with the purchase of that facility) By this period of time, WTSL was all talk however with a strong local news presentation, Major newscasts morning, noon and pm drive.   Mountain View Broadcasting held onto the WTSL, as well WGXL, WXXK and WVRR (the old WXXK facility @ 101.7) property until sold to Clear Channel.  During the time, WTSL held onto the rights to Red Sox baseball(since then baseball has moved to Great Eastern Properitys @ 93.9 and 106.7) WTSL never had an FM translator until 2018.

In 2007, Clear Channel Communications (now iHeartMedia) bought WTSL, keeping it a talk radio format, but adding Rush Limbaugh, taking the program from WNTK-FM.  Rush stayed on WTSL until it was sold again in the 2010s, it was acquired by Great Eastern Radio.  Rush returned to WNTK, which had now began WUVR.  Great Easterwhich flipped it to a sports radio format, simulcast with sister station 1230 WTSV in nearby Claremont, New Hampshire, using the ESPN Radio Network.

On June 12, 2018, WTSL dropped the ESPN sports format and began stunting with "Rapper's Delight" by the Sugarhill Gang, in preparation of launching new translator W248DA 97.5 FM Hanover.  (1230 WTSV continues with the sports format.)

On June 21, 2018 the stunting ended, with WTSL and W248DA (brand new translator) changing format to classic hip hop, branded as "Hot 97.5."

On July 29, 2022 WTSL dropped the classic hip hop format and flipped to adult hits, branded as "97.5 & 101.7 The Penguin" with the addition of the station also being fed on HD subchannel 106.1 WHDQ-HD2 and translator W269DI on 101.7 in Claremont.

Previous Logos

References

External links

TSL
Hanover, New Hampshire
Radio stations established in 1950
1950 establishments in New Hampshire
Mainstream adult contemporary radio stations in the United States